PGP or Pgp may refer to:

Science and technology
 P-glycoprotein, a type of protein
 Pelvic girdle pain, a pregnancy discomfort
 Personal Genome Project, to sequence genomes and medical records
 Pretty Good Privacy, a computer program for the encryption and decryption of data
 Penultimate Glacial Period, the ice age from c. 194,000 to c. 135,000 years ago

Organizations
 PGP Corporation, a software company, part of Symantec, which bought the rights to Pretty Good Privacy
 Procter & Gamble Productions, former name of Procter & Gamble Entertainment
 PGP-RTB, a Yugoslav record label and chain record store (1958-1993)
 PGP-RTS, successor to PGP-RTB in Serbia

Politics
 Gabonese Party of Progress (Parti gabonais du progrès), a political party in Gabon
 Pacific Green Party, the Green Party of Oregon, USA
 Party for the Government of the People, a political party in Uruguay
 Galician Party of the Proletariat, a political party in Galicia, Spain
 Partido Galing at Puso, an independent coalition, political party in Philippines

Language
 Preferred gender pronoun

Transport
 Perm Airlines, by ICAO code
 Punggol Point LRT station, by LRT station abbreviation

Other
 PGP (paintball marker), a pump-action paintball gun
 "PGP" (song), by Booba, 2019
 PGP-RTS, a Serbian record label

See also
 PCP (disambiguation)